Dibenzothiophene (DBT, diphenylene sulfide) is the organosulfur compound consisting of two benzene rings fused to a central thiophene ring. It is a colourless solid that is chemically somewhat similar to anthracene. This tricyclic heterocycle, and especially its alkyl substituted derivatives, occur widely in heavier fractions of petroleum.

Synthesis and reactions
Dibenzothiophene is prepared by the reaction of biphenyl with sulfur dichloride in the presence of aluminium chloride.

Reduction with lithium results in scission of one C-S bond.  With butyllithium, this heterocycle undergoes stepwise lithiation at the 4-position. S-oxidation with peroxides gives the sulfoxide.

References

Thiophenes